Nathaniel Johnson may refer to:

Nathaniel Johnson (politician) (1644–1712), soldier, Member of Parliament and colonial governor of South Carolina
 Nate Johnson (tackle) (Nathaniel Elijah Johnson, 1920–2004), American football tackle
 Nate Johnson (wide receiver) (Nathaniel Johnson, born 1957), American football wide receiver
Nate Johnson (basketball) (Nathanel Johnson, born 1977), American basketball player

See also
Nathaniel Johnston (1627–1705), English physician, political theorist and antiquary
Nathan Johnson (disambiguation)
Nate Johnson (disambiguation)